Stella Maudine Nickell (née Stephenson; born August 7, 1943) is an American woman who was sentenced to ninety years in prison for product tampering after she poisoned Excedrin capsules with lethal cyanide, resulting in the deaths of her husband Bruce Nickell and Sue Snow. Her May 1988 conviction and prison sentence were the first under federal product tampering laws instituted after the 1982 Chicago Tylenol murders.

Early life
Stella Maudine Stephenson was born in Colton, Oregon, to Alva Georgia "Jo" (née Duncan; later changed her name to Cora Lee) and George Stephenson. She grew up in a poor family. At age 16, following the birth of her first daughter, Cynthia Hamilton, Stella moved to Southern California, where she married and had another daughter. Stella soon found herself in various legal issues, including a conviction for fraud in 1968, a charge of spousal abuse for beating Hamilton with a curtain rod in 1969, and a conviction for forgery in 1971. She served six months in jail for the fraud charge, and was ordered into counseling after the abuse charge.

Stella met Bruce Nickell in 1974. Bruce was a heavy equipment operator with a drinking habit, which suited her lifestyle, and the two were married in 1976. In the course of their ten-year marriage, Bruce entered a drug rehab and gave up drinking, which Stella reportedly resented as she later felt he had "turned into a boring man". When her bar visits were curtailed by Bruce's sobriety, she began requesting evening shifts at her security screener job at Seattle–Tacoma International Airport and cultivated a home aquarium as a new hobby.

Deaths
On June 5, 1986, the Nickells were living in Auburn, Washington, when Bruce, 52, came home from work with a headache. According to Stella, he took four extra-strength Excedrin capsules from a bottle in their home for his headache and collapsed minutes later. Bruce died shortly thereafter at Harborview Medical Center, where treatment had failed to revive him. His death initially was ruled to be by natural causes, with attending physicians citing emphysema.

A second death, less than a week later, forced authorities to reconsider the cause of Bruce's death. On June 11, Sue Snow, a 40-year-old bank manager, took two Excedrin capsules for an early-morning headache. Her husband, Paul Webking, took two capsules from the same bottle for his arthritis and left the house for work. At 6:30 am, their 15-year-old daughter Hayley found Snow collapsed on the floor of her bathroom, unresponsive and with a faint pulse. Paramedics were called and transported Snow to Harborview Medical Center, but she died later that day without regaining consciousness.

Investigation

Initial investigation
During an autopsy on Snow, Assistant Medical Examiner Janet Miller detected the scent of bitter almonds, an odor distinctive to cyanide. Tests verified that Snow had died of acute cyanide poisoning. Investigators examined the contents of the Snow-Webking household and discovered the source of the cyanide: the bottle of Excedrin capsules that both Snow and Webking had used the morning of Snow's death. Three capsules out of those that remained in the 60-capsule bottle were found to be laced with cyanide in toxic quantities.

A murder by cyanide was sensational news in Washington State. When another tainted bottle from the same lot was found in a grocery store in nearby Kent, Bristol-Myers, the manufacturers of Excedrin, responded to the discovery with a heavily publicized recall of all Excedrin products in the Seattle area, and a group of drug companies came together to offer a $300,000 reward for the capture of the person responsible.

In response to the publicity, Stella came forward on June 19. She told police that her husband had recently died suddenly after taking pills from a 40-capsule bottle of Excedrin with the same lot number as the one that had killed Snow. Tests by the Food and Drug Administration (FDA) confirmed the presence of cyanide in her husband's remains and in two Excedrin bottles Stella had turned over to police.

Initial suspicions were directed at Bristol-Myers, with Stella and Webking filing wrongful death lawsuits against the company. The FDA inspected the Morrisville, North Carolina, plant where the tainted lot had been packaged, but found no traces of cyanide to explain its presence in the Washington bottles. On June 18, Bristol-Myers recalled all Excedrin capsules in the United States, pulling them from store shelves and warning consumers to not use any they may already have bought; two days later the company announced a recall of all of their non-prescription capsule products. On June 24, a cyanide-contaminated bottle of Anacin-3 was found at the same store where Snow had bought her contaminated Excedrin. On June 27, Washington State put into effect a 90-day ban on the sale of non-prescription medication in capsules.

Examination of the contaminated bottles by the FBI Crime Lab found that, in addition to containing cyanide powder, the poisoned capsules also contained flecks of an unknown green substance. Further tests showed that the substance was an algaecide used in home aquariums, sold under the brand name Algae Destroyer.

Focusing the investigation
With contamination of the Excedrin at the source having been ruled out, investigators began to focus their investigation on the end-users of the product. The FBI began an investigation into possible product tampering having been the source of the poison. At the time, Excedrin was packaged in plastic bottles with the mouth of the bottle sealed with foil and the lid secured to the bottle with plastic wrap.

Both Stella and Webking were asked to take polygraph examinations. Webking did so, but Stella, who had started drinking heavily, declined. A lawyer representing Stella told reporters that she was too "shaken up" to be subjected to the examination. Investigators' suspicions began to turn to Stella when they discovered that she claimed that the two contaminated Excedrin bottles that she had turned over to police had been purchased at different times and different locations. A total of five bottles had been found to have been contaminated in the entire country, and it was regarded as suspicious that Stella would happen to have acquired two of them purely by chance.

With investigatory focus turned to Stella, detectives uncovered more circumstantial evidence pointing to her as the culprit. She had taken out a total of about $76,000 in insurance coverage on her husband's life, with an additional payout of $100,000 if his death was accidental. She was also known to have, even before Snow's death, repeatedly disputed doctors' ruling that her husband had died of natural causes. Further FBI investigation showed that Bruce's purported signatures on at least two of the insurance policies in his name had been forged. Investigators were also able to verify that Stella had purchased Algae Destroyer from a local fish store; it was speculated that the algaecide had become mixed with the cyanide when Stella used the same container to crush both substances without washing it in between uses.

Stella finally consented to a polygraph examination in November 1986. She failed and investigators narrowed their focus to her even further. Concrete evidence proving that she had ever purchased or used cyanide was lacking, and despite their relative certainty that she had orchestrated the poisonings as either an elaborate cover-up for an insurance-motivated murder of her husband or a desperate attempt to force her husband's death to be ruled an accident to increase her insurance payout, they were unable to build a strong case supporting arrest.

Breaking the case
In January 1987, Stella's now-grown daughter, Cynthia Hamilton, approached police with information: her mother had spoken to her repeatedly about wanting Bruce dead, having grown bored with him after he quit drinking. Stella, Hamilton claimed, had even told her that she had tried to poison Bruce previously with foxglove hidden in capsules. Bruce had taken them to no effect save for complaining of sudden drowsiness. Following that failure, Stella had begun library research into other methods and hit upon cyanide. Hamilton also claimed that Stella had spoken to her about what the two of them could do with the insurance money if Bruce was dead.

Records from the Auburn Public Library, when subpoenaed, showed that Stella had checked out numerous books about poisons, including Human Poisonings from Native and Cultivated Plants and Deadly Harvest. The former was marked as overdue in library records, indicating that she had borrowed but never returned it. The FBI identified her fingerprints on cyanide-related pages of a number of the works she had checked out during this period. By the summer of 1987, even Stella's attorneys acknowledged that she was the prime suspect in the case.

Arrest and trial
On December 9, 1987, Stella was indicted by a federal grand jury on five counts of product tampering, including two which resulted in the deaths of Bruce and Snow, and arrested the same day. She went on trial in April 1988 and was found guilty of all charges on May 9, after five days of jury deliberation. 

Stella's legal team sought a mistrial on grounds of jury tampering and judicial misconduct. One of the jurors had been a plaintiff in a case involving a pill baked into Pepperidge Farm Goldfish crackers. While it was deemed to be a manufacturing error, the defense thought that it involved product tampering and therefore should have been disclosed during jury selection. However, the motion was denied. 

Stella was sentenced to two terms of ninety years in prison for the deaths of Bruce and Snow, and three ten-year terms for the other product tampering charges. All sentences were to run concurrently, and the judge ordered Stella to pay a small fine and forfeit her remaining assets to the families of her victims. She was denied parole in 2017.

As of April 2019, Stella Nickell is housed at female-only low security/minimum security Federal Correctional Institution, Dublin in California, just east of San Francisco. She will be eligible for release in 2040, with credit given for good behavior, by which time she will be 96 years old. Nickell petitioned for compassionate early release in 2022, stating that her health is failing, and this request was denied.

Appeals and subsequent petitions
Stella continued to maintain her innocence after her trial. An appeal based on jury tampering and judicial misconduct issues was rejected by the United States Court of Appeals for the Ninth Circuit in August 1989. A second appeal, beginning in 2001, was filed by her new attorney, Carl Park Colbert, based on evidence obtained by private detectives Al Farr and Paul Ciolino, requesting a new trial on the basis of new evidence having been discovered that the FBI may have withheld documents from the defense. The appeal was denied, though Stella and her team continue to assert her innocence. Stella claimed that her daughter, Cynthia Hamilton, lied about her involvement in the case in order to reap the $300,000 of reward money being offered. Hamilton eventually collected $250,000 of that money. Stella also alleges that the evidence actually points to another person as the killer, and that the testimony about various smaller details in the case, such as the store owner who testified about her having purchased Algae Destroyer, was influenced by promises of payment.

FDA regulations
After the 1982 Chicago Tylenol murders, new FDA regulations went into effect which made it a federal crime—rather than just a state or local crime—to tamper with consumer products. Local and state authorities are not, however, prevented from also filing charges in such cases. Under this law, Stella Nickell's crime was prosecutable as a federal product tampering case as well as a state murder case, and she was not convicted of murder, but of product tampering that caused death. The possibility of state charges for the actual murders of Bruce and Snow continues to exist.

In media
Seattle author Gregg Olsen wrote about the Nickell case in his 1993 book Bitter Almonds: The True Story of Mothers, Daughters and the Seattle Cyanide Murders. The case was also featured in episodes of Autopsy, Forensic Files, The New Detectives, Mysteries at the Museum, and Snapped, as well as two episodes of Deadly Women. The murders are discussed in the Jodi Picoult novel House Rules, published in 2010. It was also featured in episode 93 of Casefile True Crime Podcast in August 2018. The case was referenced in an episode of In Plain Sight titled "Kill Pill", which aired November 23, 2018 on the Investigation Discovery channel.

The 2000 TV film Who Killed Sue Snow? was to be made about the Nickell case to air on USA Network, but it was cancelled shortly before production began. One factor was strong objections from advertisers, including Johnson & Johnson, owner of the Tylenol brand of painkillers which had been affected by the 1982 Chicago case. Additionally, network executives feared the film would inspire copycat crimes. The film was to have been directed by Jeff Reiner and starring Katey Sagal as Stella Nickell.

Notes

References

Bibliography

1943 births
Living people
20th-century American criminals
American female murderers
American people convicted of murder
Criminals from Portland, Oregon
Criminals from Washington (state)
Mariticides
Murderers for life insurance money
People from Clackamas County, Oregon
Poisoners
People convicted of murder by the United States federal government